Olene is a genus of tussock moths in the family Erebidae. The genus was erected by Jacob Hübner in 1823.

Species
Olene cookiensis (Strand, 1915)
Olene dalbergiae (Moore, 1888)
Olene dryina (Lower, 1900)
Olene dudgeoni (Swinhoe, 1907)
Olene hypersceles (Collenette, 1932)
Olene inclusa (Walker, 1856)
Olene magnalia (Swinhoe, 1903)
Olene mendosa Hübner, 1823
Olene ruficosta Bethune-Baker, 1911
Olene tenebrosa (Walker, 1865)

References

Lymantriinae
Noctuoidea genera
Taxa named by Jacob Hübner